Rhondda is a constituency of the Senedd. It elects one Member of the Senedd by the first past the post method of election. Also, however, it is one of eight constituencies in the South Wales Central electoral region, which elects four additional members, in addition to eight constituency members, to produce a degree of proportional representation for the region as a whole.

Boundaries

The constituency was created for the first election to the Assembly, in 1999, with the name and boundaries of the Rhondda Westminster constituency. It is entirely within the preserved county of Mid Glamorgan.

The other seven constituencies of the region are Cardiff Central, Cardiff North, Cardiff South and Penarth, Cardiff West, Cynon Valley, Pontypridd and Vale of Glamorgan.

Voting
In general elections for the Senedd, each voter has two votes. The first vote may be used to vote for a candidate to become the Member of the Senedd for the voter's constituency, elected by the first past the post system. The second vote may be used to vote for a regional closed party list of candidates. Additional member seats are allocated from the lists by the d'Hondt method, with constituency results being taken into account in the allocation.

Assembly Members and Members of the Senedd

Elections

Elections in the 2020s

Elections in the 2010s

Regional ballots rejected at the count: 112

Elections in the 2000s

2003 Electorate: 50,463
Regional ballots rejected: 394

Elections in the 1990s

1999 Electorate: 55,266

References

Senedd constituencies in the South Wales Central electoral region
Politics of Rhondda Cynon Taf
1999 establishments in Wales
Constituencies established in 1999